Events in the year 1432 in Norway.

Incumbents
Monarch: Eric III

Events
January - Pietro Querini and his crew is shipwrecked at Røst.

Arts and literature

Aslak Bolt's cadastre, cadastre of the Archdiocese of Nidaros is written by Aslak Bolt.

Births

Deaths

References

Norway